Audrey the Trainwreck is a 2010 American romantic comedy-drama film directed by Frank V. Ross and starring Joe Swanberg, Kurt Naebig, Nick Offerman, Jess Weixler and Rebecca Spence.

Plot
The film is the story of two people caught in the routines of work and circles of friends. The days begin with an alarm and ends with the fading sound of a television. Ron Hogan, a 28 year old ATM parts purchaser, and Stacy Ryan, a 27 year old, oddly charming courier, meet through a match making Internet service and go through the routine of falling for one another.

Cast
Anthony J. Baker as Ron Hogan
Alexi Wasser as Stacy Ryan
Joe Swanberg as Jeremy Roth
Danny Rhodes as Scott Kaniewski
Ivory Tiffin as Darci Stanton
Kurt Naebig as Tim Hagan
Allison Latta as Drunk Girl
Jennifer Knox as Jenny the Bride
Nick Offerman as David George
Jess Weixler as Tammy
Rebecca Spence as Kate Meyers

Reception
Adam Keleman of Slant Magazine awarded the film three stars out of four.

References

External links
 
 

2010 films
2010 romantic comedy-drama films
American romantic comedy-drama films
2010 comedy films
2010 drama films
2010s English-language films
2010s American films